Michael Munn ( – July 2022) was a British author, film historian, and actor.

Munn's biography of Steve McQueen has been described as preposterous, and doubt cast on his biographies of Frank Sinatra, John Wayne, Jimmy Stewart, Sir Laurence Olivier, Richard Burton, and David Niven.

Munn lived in Sudbury, Suffolk. He died from a heart attack in July 2022, at the age of 69.

Selected books

1982 The stories behind the scenes of the great film epics – Illustrated Publications 
1986 Charlton Heston – Robson Books 
1987 The Hollywood Murder Casebook – Robson Books 
1989 Kirk Douglas – St. Martin's Press 
1989 Trevor Howard: the man and his films – Robson Books 
1991 Hollywood Rogues – Robson Books 
1992 Clint Eastwood: Hollywood's Loner – Robson Books 
1992 with Sparks, William The last of the Cockleshell Heroes: a World War Two memoir – ISIS Large Print 
1993 Hollywood Bad – St. Martin's Press 
1993 The Hollywood connection: the true story of organised crime in Hollywood — Robson Books 
1995 Burt Lancaster: The Terrible-Tempered Charmer – Robson Books 
1995 Stars at War – Robson Books 
1996 X-rated: the paranormal experiences of the movie star greats — Robson Books 

1997 Gene Hackman — Robert Hale 
1997 The Sharon Stone story – Robson Books 
1999 Gregory Peck – ISIS Large Print Books 
2002 Sinatra: the untold story – Robson Books 
2003 John Wayne: The Man Behind the Myth – Robson Books 
2005 Jimmy Stewart: The Truth Behind the Legend – Robson Books 
2007 Lord Larry: The Secret Life of Laurence Olivier – Robson Books 
2008 Richard Burton: prince of players – Skyhorse Pub. 
2009 David Niven: The Man Behind the Balloon – JR Books Ltd 
2010 Steve McQueen: Living on the Edge – Aurum Press

References

External links
Munn's website

1950s births
Year of birth missing
2022 deaths
British film historians
People from Sudbury, Suffolk